Besides is a compilation album by the alternative rock band Sugar; it contains B-sides from the group's previously released singles. It also has live and remixed versions of existing tracks from the band's two full albums and one EP, as well as several studio and live versions of tracks that had been unavailable on any of their previous albums. The CD included a QuickTime video for the single "Gee Angel", although this was not advertised on the CD packaging.

Critical reception
Trouser Press wrote that "the capper is a titanic version of the Who’s 'Armenia City in the Sky' (long a staple of the band’s live set), which trails a dayglo jet-stream that’s impossible to avoid getting swept up in."

Track listing

The Joke Is Always on Us, Sometimes.

The first 25,000 copies of Besides were packaged with a bonus disc titled The Joke Is Always on Us, Sometimes. The disc is a live Sugar concert from November 2, 1994, at First Avenue club in Minneapolis, Minnesota.

Charts
Album

References

Sugar (American band) albums
Albums produced by Lou Giordano
Albums produced by Bob Mould
1995 compilation albums
1995 live albums
Rykodisc live albums
Rykodisc compilation albums